The 1887 Iowa gubernatorial election was held on Tuesday November 8, 1887. Incumbent Republican William Larrabee defeated Democratic nominee Thomas J. Anderson with 50.18% of the vote.

General election

Candidates
Major party candidates
William Larrabee, Republican
Thomas J. Anderson, Democratic 

Other candidates
M. J. Cain, Union Labor
V. G. Farnham, Prohibition

Results

References

1887
Iowa